Kovačev (Cyrillic: Ковачев) is a Croatian, Serbian and Macedonian surname. Notable people with the surname include:

  (1839–1898)
 Branislav Lala Kovačev (1939–2012)

See also 
 Kovachev (Ковачев), surname
 Kovač (surname)
 Kovačec, surname
 Kovaček, surname
 Kováčik, surname
 Kovačić (surname)
 Kovačina (surname)
 Kovačevik, surname
 Kovačević, surname
 Kovačevski, surname

Macedonian-language surnames
Serbian surnames
Montenegrin surnames
Bosnian surnames
Croatian surnames